Citizen science projects are activities sponsored by a wide variety of organizations so non-scientists can meaningfully contribute to scientific research.  Activities vary widely from transcribing old ship logbooks to digitize the data as part of the Old Weather project to observing and counting birds at home or in the field for eBird. Participation can be as simple as playing a computer game for a project called Eyewire that may help scientists learn more about retinal neurons. It can also be more in depth, such as when citizens collect water quality data over time to assess the health of local waters, or help discover and name new species of insects. An emerging branch of Citizen Science are Community Mapping projects that utilize smartphone and tablet technology. For example, TurtleSAT is a community mapping project that is mapping freshwater turtle deaths throughout Australia.

This list of citizen science projects involves projects that engage all age groups. There are projects specifically aimed at the younger age demographic like iTechExplorers which was created by a 14 year old in the UK to assess the effects of bedtime technology on the body's circadian rhythm and can be completed in a classroom setting. Other projects like AgeGuess focus on the senior demographics and enable the elderly to upload photos of themselves so the public can guess different ages.

Lists of citizen science projects may change. For example, the Old Weather project website indicates that  January 10, 2015, 51% of the logs were completed. When that project reaches 100 percent, it will move to the completed list.

There are more than 3,000 active and searchable global citizen science projects listed on the SciStarter website.

Active citizen science projects

Completed or inactive projects

See also
 Participatory monitoring
 List of grid computing projects
 List of volunteer computing projects
 List of free and open-source Android applications
 List of grid computing projects

Notes

References

Science-related lists